I Can't Escape is a 1934 American film directed by Otto Brower. The film is also known as The Magic Vault (American alternative title).

Cast 
Onslow Stevens as Steve Nichols, alias Steve Cummings
Lila Lee as Mae Nichols
Russell Gleason as Tom Martin
William Desmond as Parole Officer Donovan
Hooper Atchley as Harley
Otis Harlan as Jim Bonn
Kane Richmond as Bob, college boy at club
Clara Kimball Young as Mrs. Wilson
Eddie Gribbon as Regan - Beat Cop
Nat Carr as Mr. Watson, clothier
Richard Cramer as Joe, bartender-pimp

External links 

1934 films
1934 crime drama films
American black-and-white films
American crime drama films
Films directed by Otto Brower
1930s American films